Riaan Schoeman (born 18 September 1989 in Vereeniging) is a South African swimmer who specializes in the Individual Medley and Freestyle events. He is a multiple-time South African champion and record holder for the Individual Medley and Freestyle events. Schoeman also competes in open water events and was victorious in the 2009 edition of the Midmar Mile. His brother Henri Schoeman is also an athlete, winning bronze in the 2016 Summer Olympics triathlon.

Throughout his career he has been ranked as high as second in the 400m Individual Medley world rankings and has consistently finished among the top ten. Schoeman has represented South Africa at the 2008 Summer Olympics in Beijing and the 2012 Summer Olympics in London.

At the 2010 Commonwealth Games in Delhi, India, Schoeman claimed a bronze medal in the 400m Individual Medley. He has also competed in both the 2007 All-Africa Games in Algiers as well as the 2011 All-Africa Games held in Maputo, he received seven medals throughout these Games.

References

South African male swimmers
Living people
Afrikaner people
Olympic swimmers of South Africa
Swimmers at the 2008 Summer Olympics
Swimmers at the 2012 Summer Olympics
Swimmers at the 2010 Commonwealth Games
Commonwealth Games bronze medallists for South Africa
Male medley swimmers
Commonwealth Games medallists in swimming
South African people of Dutch descent
1989 births
African Games gold medalists for South Africa
African Games medalists in swimming
African Games silver medalists for South Africa
African Games bronze medalists for South Africa
Competitors at the 2007 All-Africa Games
Competitors at the 2011 All-Africa Games
Medallists at the 2010 Commonwealth Games